Jaithari is a town and a tehsil in Anuppur district in the Indian state of Madhya Pradesh.

Geography

Demographics
, 
the total population of Jaithari was 8,9000, with 4,1480 male and 3,7520 female residents.

Railway station
Jaithari can be accessed by Jaithari railway station, which is situated on Bilaspur–Katni line under Bilaspur railway division, part of the South East Central Railway zone.

Locations within tehsil
Guwari, Murra Tola, Dhangwan, Chandpur are four main villages of Jaithari tehsil. The Son Nadi river flows through the tehsil and it is well known for the Jaithari Thermal Power Project (Moserbaer power plant) which opened in 2014.

The market of Jaithari town is famous for mangoes and tomatoes. Guwari is the main village of Jaithari town.

Guwari has Shukla family who established guwari and nearby village.

References

Cities and towns in Anuppur district